The Roman Catholic Diocese of Santa Rosa de Osos is a diocese located in the city of Santa Rosa de Osos in the Ecclesiastical province of Santa Fe de Antioquia in Colombia.

History
5 February 1917: Established as Diocese of Santa Rosa de Osos from the Diocese of Antioquía

Special churches
Minor Basilicas:
Basílica de Nuestra Señora de las Misericordias, Santa Rosa de Osos
Basílica del Señor de los Milagros, San Pedro de los Milagros
Basilica of Our Lady of Mercy, Yarumal

Bishops

Ordinaries
Maximiliano Crespo Rivera † (7 Feb 1917 – 15 Nov 1923) Appointed, Archbishop of Popayán
Miguel Ángel Builes Gómez † (27 May 1924 – 29 Sep 1971) Died
Joaquín García Ordóñez † (29 Sep 1971 – 10 Jun 1995) Retired
Jairo Jaramillo Monsalve (10 Jun 1995 – 13 Nov 2010) Appointed, Archbishop of Barranquilla
Jorge Alberto Ossa Soto (15 Jul 2011 – 15 Oct 2019) Appointed, Archbishop of Nueva Pamplona

Other priest of this diocese who became bishop
Farly Yovany Gil Betancur, appointed Bishop of Montelibano in 2020

See also
Roman Catholicism in Colombia

Sources

External links
 GCatholic.org

Roman Catholic dioceses in Colombia
Roman Catholic Ecclesiastical Province of Santa Fe de Antioquia
Christian organizations established in 1917
Roman Catholic dioceses and prelatures established in the 20th century